Z30 may refer to:

BlackBerry Z30, a smartphone
Casio Exilim Z30, a digital camera
German destroyer Z30
Toyota Soarer Z30, an automobile
Z30 small nucleolar RNA